The United States Coast Guard (USCG) Women's Reserve, also known as the SPARS (SPARS was the acronym for "Semper Paratus—Always Ready"), was the women's branch of the United States Coast Guard Reserve. It was established by the United States Congress and signed into law by President Franklin D. Roosevelt on 23 November 1942. This law authorized the acceptance of women into the reserve as commissioned officers and at the enlisted level for the duration of World War II plus six months. Its purpose was to release officers and men for sea duty and to replace them with women at shore stations. Dorothy C. Stratton was appointed director of the SPARS with the rank of lieutenant commander and later promoted to captain.  

The qualifying age for officer candidates was between 20 and 50, and they were required to have a college degree, or two years of college and two years of professional or business experience. For enlisted personnel, the qualifying age was between 20 and 36, and they were required to have completed at least two years of high school. Initially African American women were not recruited, however, late in the war five African American women were accepted and served as SPARS. Officer candidates received their indoctrination at Smith College, Northampton, Massachusetts and later at the USCG Academy, New London, Connecticut. Enlisted personnel first received their training on several college campuses. Later, their training took place at Palm Beach, Florida, in the Biltmore Hotel that was remodeled for use as a training center. Toward the end of the war, training of enlisted personnel was transferred from Palm Beach to Manhattan Beach, Brooklyn, New York.

Women of the SPARS served in every USCG district except Puerto Rico and also served in Hawaii and Alaska. Most officers were general duty officers, and most of the enlisted women performed clerical duties. The SPARS peak strength was approximately 11,000 officers and enlisted personnel.
It was inactivated in 1947 but reestablished on a much smaller scale in 1949.
Approximately 200 former SPARS reenlisted and served during the Korean War. The majority of them served at the Coast Guard Headquarters in Washington, D.C.
In 1973 Congressional legislation ended the Women's Reserve (SPARS) and women were first officially integrated into the active-duty Coast Guard and the Coast Guard Reserve. Female reservists then serving on active duty were given the choice of enlisting in the regular Coast Guard or completing their reserve enlistments.

Background

The (USCG) Women's Reserve act was passed by the 77th United States Congress, and became Public Law 773 when signed by  President Franklin D. Roosevelt on 23 November 1942. It amended the USCG Auxiliary and Reserve Act of 1941, providing for the releasing of officers and enlisted men for duty at sea and to be replaced by women at shore stations. It was established as a branch of the USCG Reserve, with authority to enlist and appoint women to serve during World War II and for six months thereafter. The reservists were to be trained and qualified for duty at the continental shore stations of the USCG. They were not to be used to replace civil service personnel. The law was similar to that of the Women's Naval Reserve, better known as the WAVES.  Initially, the SPARS were only stationed in the United States, but in 1944 they were allowed to deploy to Hawaii and Alaska (then, territories of the U.S.). The USCG was the smallest of the military branches and was under the wing of the United States Department of the Navy, although, just prior to World War II, it had been under the supervision of the United States Department of the Treasury.

Dorothy C. Stratton was appointed director of the Women's Reserve (SPARS) with the rank of lieutenant commander and was later promoted to captain. She had been the Dean of Women on leave from Purdue University and a lieutenant in the WAVES. Stratton is credited with creating the nautical name of SPARS. The name was fashioned by taking the first letters of the USCG's Latin motto, Semper Paratus, and the first letters of its English translation, "Always Ready", Stratton held a master's degree from the University of Chicago and a doctorate from Columbia University. She died in 2006 at age 107. The name also alludes to a spar, a wooden pole that supports a sail, and Stratton also suggested that it could stand for the Four Freedoms: Speech, Press, Assembly, Religion.

Recruiting

At the outset, the U.S. Navy, U.S. Marine Corps, and USCG agreed to recruit and to train the members of their respective women's reserves together, using existing Navy facilities. For recruiting purposes, the SPARS would utilize the Offices of the Naval Officer Procurement. Their first recruiting efforts got underway in December 1942, but they were hampered somewhat by the absence of SPAR recruiting personnel. Their absence resulted from the agreement between the Navy and the USCG, whereby the SPARS would receive its first personnel by transfer from the WAVES. A total of 15 WAVE officers and 153 WAVE enlisted women requested and were discharged from the WAVES to become the first SPARS. Eventually, SPAR officers were assigned to most of the Naval Officer Procurement offices. The recruiting information about SPARS was disseminated with WAVES publicity materials and it was also done separately. But it became apparent that the job of selling the SPARS included selling the USCG as well.

By June 1943, it was clear to the USCG that the recruiting process in place did not favor the SPARS, so it withdrew from the joint agreement effective 1 July 1943. Hence, all women applicants for SPARS would be interviewed and enlisted at USCG district recruiting stations. The change was met with increased enthusiasm by the recruiters and it proved positive overall. Still, the competition remained keen with the other, better known, women services. Some recruiters referred to themselves as peddlers of patriotism, but their lot was not an easy one. In their book, Three Years Behind the Mast, the authors Mary Lyne and Kay Arthur, both officers in SPARS, described the realities of recruiting in this way: During the day, we made speeches, distributed posters, decorated windows, led parades, manned information booths, interviewed applicants, appeared on radio programs, and gave aptitude tests. By night, we made more speeches; prayed women would be drafted, and went to bed dreaming about our quotas.  The main recruiting effort had ended. During the 25-month recruitment period, about 11,000 women signed enlistment contracts to serve in the SPARS. Yeoman Third Class Dorothy Tuttle was the first woman to enlist in the SPARS at a recruiting station on 7 December 1942.

In late 1942, recruiting requirements were such that both enlisted and officer candidates had to be American citizens; have no children under 18 years of age; present three character references; pass a physical examination; and submit a record of occupation after leaving school. Enlisted applicants were also required to have completed at least two years of high school and be between the ages of 20 and 36 years. Officer candidates were expected to be college graduates, or to have completed two years of college, and have at least two years of acceptable business or professional experience, and be between the ages of 20 and 50 years. Certain regulations with respect to marriage applied to both enlisted and officer candidates. Married women could enlist provided their husbands were not in the USCG. Unmarried women had to agree not to marry until they had finished their training period. After training, they could marry a civilian or service man who was not in the USCG.

In August 1943, recruiting policies were changed to permit SPARS to marry men of the USCG without having to resign. The USCG would continue to accept applicants who were married to men in the Army, Navy, or Marine Corps, but would not accept a woman who was already married to an enlisted man or an officer serving in the USCG. However, women could join the SPARS if their husbands were enrolled as temporary members of the reserve. In November 1943, the marriage policy with respect to recruits was changed further to permit women who were wives of cadets, warrant officers, or enlisted men of the USCG to enlist or be commissioned in the SPARs. The ban remained on women whose husbands were commissioned officers in the USCG with the rank of ensign or above.

Although the USCG officially opened its doors to African-American women in October 1944, it was not until March 1945 that the first five women were accepted; they were the only African-American women to serve in the SPARS before it was first inactivated in 1947. Although the Women's Army Corps (WAC) accepted African-American women from its inception, the U.S. Navy's Women Accepted for Volunteer Emergency Service (WAVES) only began accepting African-American women in October 1944, with fewer than 100 of them serving in the WAVES, and the U.S. Marine Corps Women's Reserve never opened its ranks to African-American women. The five African-American women who served in the SPARS before it was first inactivated in 1947 were: Olivia Hooker, D. Winifred Byrd, Julia Mosley, Yvonne Cumberbatch, and Aileen Cooke. Olivia Hooker was the first of them and thus the first African-American woman to enter the Coast Guard.

Training

Officer training

The agreement between the Navy and the USCG required the initial classes of SPARS officer candidates to receive their indoctrination training at Smith College, Northampton, Massachusetts; officially known as the United States Naval Reserve (WR) Midshipmen's School. But in June 1943, the USCG withdrew from the agreement, and the indoctrination of SPARS officer candidates was transferred to the USCG Academy at New London, Connecticut. It was the only U.S. military service that trained women officer candidates at its own academy.

Initially, the training period was for six weeks; later it was changed to eight weeks. General in scope, the program was designed to give cadets an overall view of the USCG. Academic study included: administration, correspondence, communications, history, organization, personnel, public speaking, ships, and special lectures and visual aids. The regimental part of the training was designed to help cadets adjust to military life, and to acquaint them with their responsibilities as officers. The cadets ranged in age from 20 to 40, with diverse civilian backgrounds from teachers and journalists to lawyers and technicians.

During the two-year life of the officer indoctrination program, about 930 women completed the training and were commissioned as SPARS officers. In late 1944, the USCG determined that this complement was sufficient for its needs and discontinued the program. However, to replace the officers who had gone overseas, and those separated from the SPARS, the officer candidate school was later reopened for one last class. The candidates were all former enlisted personnel, who received their indoctrination at the USCG training station, Manhattan Beach, Brooklyn, New York. The USCG strived to recruit officer candidates who already had some civilian training or work experience of the type that could be used without further training. As result, only about one third of the officers received any specialized training. However, the specialized training programs produced 203 communications officers, and 106 pay and supply officers, prior to its discontinuance in November and December 1944.

Enlisted training

At first, the SPARS enlisted personnel received their indoctrination training on college campuses operated for such by the U.S. Navy.  A few SPARS received their recruit training at Oklahoma A&M University, Stillwater, Oklahoma, another 150 of them received their training at Iowa State Teachers College, Cedar Falls, Iowa, and about 1,900 SPARS received their recruit training at Hunter College in the Bronx, New York. In March 1943, the USCG decided that there was a need to establish its own training center for the indoctrination of recruits and to provide specialized training programs. The site selected was the Palm Beach Biltmore Hotel, Palm Beach, Florida; it was leased, and then commissioned as a training station, on 23 May 1943. Beginning in late June, all enlisted personnel received their indoctrination and specialized training at this station.

The recruits' indoctrination period at Palm Beach was six weeks. It covered instruction on subjects such as: activities, organization, personnel, current events, and social hygiene. The physical education aspects consisted of: body mechanics, swimming, games, and drill. Another important part of recruit training was the testing, classification, and selection process. This was designed to make the most of the recruit's abilities, background and interests. The results of the testing were usually the basis for general assignments or the opportunity for specialized training.

From the first class of 14 June 1943, until the final class of 16 December 1944, more than 7,000 recruits were indoctrinated at the Palm Beach station. Approximately, 70 percent of the enlisted women who received recruit training also received some specialized training. Yeoman and storekeepers represented the largest share, but many SPARS were given the opportunity for training in other fields. Some attended other Navy schools and were trained as motion picture sound technicians, link trainer operators, parachute riggers, and air control operators. Others attended USCG schools and learned to be: cooks, bakers, radioman, pharmacist mates, radio technicians, and motor vehicle drivers. In January 1945, the training of enlisted personnel was transferred from Palm Beach to Manhattan Beach, Brooklyn, New York, the largest USCG training station for men.

Assignments

The SPARS were assigned to every USCG district except Puerto Rico. In some districts, they worked in the district offices and in the small field units as well.  Most officers held general duty billets, which included administrative and supervisory assignments. Others served as communication officers, supply officers, and barracks and recruiting officers.  The bulk of the enlisted women had clerical and stenographic civilian backgrounds and the USCG wanted them for this reason. Exciting jobs were few and far between, yet not all assigned to paperwork found it boring. Some saw how their contribution fit into the big picture. In smaller numbers, the enlisted personnel were found in practically every other billet, from baking pies, to rigging parachutes, and driving jeeps.

Initially, SPARS were prohibited from serving in USCG districts outside the country. But in late 1944, Congress amended the law allowing SPARS to serve overseas. For the SPARS, this meant Hawaii and Alaska. However, only those with good records, good physical health, a year's service, and training and experience in the types of duty requested were selected. About 200 women served in Hawaii, doing roughly the same kind of work, and holding the same ratings, that they would have held in the United States. About an equal number of women served in Alaska as well. 

A select group of SPAR officers and enlisted personnel were assigned to work with the Long Range Aid to Navigation at monitoring stations in the Continental United States. Better known under the acronym LORAN, it was a top-secret radio navigation system developed for ships at sea, and long-range aircraft. The first monitoring station staffed by SPARS was at Chatham, Massachusetts, after they had received two months of instructions at M.I.T. on the operation and maintenance of LORAN. The unit at Chatham is believed to have been (at the time) the only all-female staffed one of its kind in the world.

The SPARS was inactivated on July 25, 1947, but was reestablished on a much smaller scale in 1949.

Approximately 200 women who had been in the SPARS reenlisted and served during the Korean War. They mostly served at the Coast Guard Headquarters in Washington, D.C.

In 1973 women were integrated into the active-duty Coast Guard and the Coast Guard Reserve. The SPARS ended and those in it were sent to the Coast Guard Reserve.

Women of the SPARS

The average SPAR officer was 29 years old, single, a college graduate, and had worked seven years in a professional or managerial position (in education or government) before entering the service. The average enlisted SPAR was 24 years old, single, a high school graduate, and had worked for over three years in a clerical or sales job before joining the service. The likelihood was that she came from the state of Massachusetts, New York, Pennsylvania, Illinois, Ohio, or California. The reasons for becoming a SPAR differed, but most likely it was patriotism, self-advancement, desire for travel and adventure, or the loss of a loved one in the war.

In their off-duty hours, SPARS contributed time and effort to many community and wartime causes. Some became active nurse's aides, some rolled bandages for the Red Cross, others donated blood to blood banks, some visited service men in convalescent hospitals, and others collected gifts for the men overseas. Many of them were also involved in the March of Dimes campaigns, and war chest and war bond drives. Both officers and enlisted were awarded ribbons and medals based on their service, and some were acknowledged for their outstanding contributions to the SPARS and the country. In general, SPARS looked upon their service favorably, and many of them found a form of kinship in having been a part of the nation's military forces during wartime.

Demobilization
With the surrender of Japan in August 1945, the USCG demobilization effort began, and the SPARS were gradually discharged. They were separated from the service on a point system, and on the basis of their jobs. However, many SPARS were reassigned to the personnel separation centers to help with demobilization (women and men reservists) and they were not separated until it was completed. The Women's Reserve of the USCG (SPARS) was inactivated on 25 July 1947, but was reestablished on a much smaller scale in 1949.
Approximately 200 women who had been in the SPARS reenlisted and served during the Korean War. They mostly served at the Coast Guard Headquarters in Washington, D.C.
In 1973 women were integrated into the active-duty Coast Guard and the Coast Guard Reserve. The SPARS ended and those in it were sent to the Coast Guard Reserve.

Legacy

In his foreword to Three Years Behind the Mast, Commodore J. A. Hirschfield, USCG, observed that the SPARS asked no favors and no privileges. They did their jobs with enthusiasm, with efficiency, and a minimum of fanfare. The USCG was fortunate in having the help of the SPARS who volunteered for duty when their country needed them, and carried the job through to a successful finish.

Although the SPARS no longer exist as a separate organization, the term is sometimes informally used for a female Coast Guardsman; however, it is not an officially sanctioned term.

Uniforms

The uniforms worn by the SPARS were the same design and style as those worn by the WAVES, except for the service insignias; created for them by the New York fashion house of Mainbocher. The decision made regarding the type and style of the uniforms was largely that of the U.S. Navy Uniform Board. The standard uniform was a navy blue suit, consisting of a jacket and a six-gored skirt. Included were black oxfords and plain black pumps; a brimmed hat; black gloves; black leather purse, and rain and winter coats.  The summer uniform was of the same design as the standard uniform, worn in white Palm Beach cloth, tropical worsted, or other light fabrics. Shoes were oxfords or pumps of white leather. The summer work wear was a grey and white striped seersucker dress with jacket.

See also
 WAVES (Women Accepted for Volunteer Emergency Service)
 United States Marine Corps Women's Reserve
 Women Airforce Service Pilots (WASP)
 Women in the Air Force (WAF)
 Women in the United States Navy
 Women's Army Corps (United States Army)
 Women's Auxiliary Air Force (British)
 Women's Royal Canadian Naval Service 
 Women's Royal Naval Service (British) "Wrens"
 Women's Royal Australian Naval Service

Notes

Footnotes

Citations

References

Further reading
 
 Litoff, Judy Barrett, and Smith, David C.; "The Wartime History of the Waves, SPARS, Women Marines, Army and Navy Nurses, and WASP's." in A Women's War Too: US Women in the Military in World War II ed. by Paula Nassen Poulos.(Washington: National Archives and Records Administration, 1996) pp 47–67

External links
 
 SPARS history and WWII women's uniforms in color—World War II US women's service organizations (WAC, WAVES, ANC, NNC, USMCWR, PHS, SPARS, ARC, and WASP)

SPARS